The chapters of Gravitation are written and illustrated by Maki Murakami. Tokyopop licensed the series for an English-language release in North America and published the twelve volumes from August 5, 2003 to  July 12, 2005. Madman Entertainment distributes the series in New Zealand and Australia.


Volume list

References

Gravitation